Per Oscar "Pete" Johansen is a Norwegian violinist born 11 May 1962, recognized for his many recordings in albums by gothic metal bands, in which he is distinguished for his peculiar style.

Biography 
Johansen began playing the violin at the age of 9, and started his first tour with a country music band when he was 16 years old. 

During the 1990s, he fronted a band called Modesty Blaise.  The band released one album on SPM Records called "Face of the Sun." 

He has worked with The Sins of Thy Beloved, Tristania, Sirenia and Morgul.

Currently, he plays violin for The Art of Departure, whose debut EP is set to come out some time in 2021.

Discography 
Johansen has played with the following bands on the following albums:
The Sins of Thy Beloved 
 Lake of Sorrow 
 Perpetual Desolation
Tristania
 Widow's Weeds
 Beyond the Veil
 World of Glass
 Rubicon
Morgul 
 All Dead Here...
 The Horror Grandeur
 Sketch of Supposed Murderer
Sirenia
 At Sixes and Sevens
 The Art of Departure
 TBA (2021)

References

External links 
Metal Storm Profile
Last.fm Profile
  - Pete Johansen playing

1962 births
Living people
Norwegian heavy metal musicians
21st-century violinists